The Bahna is a small left tributary of the river Danube in Romania. It discharges into the Danube near Ilovița.

References

Rivers of Romania
Rivers of Mehedinți County